Chernyshev is a lunar impact crater that is located in the northern part of the Moon's far side. It lies to the northeast of the crater Chandler, and to the southeast of the walled plain D'Alembert.

The rim of this crater has been worn by impacts, and multiple tiny craters lie along the rim. The southern part of the rim in particular has been more heavily eroded and modified by impacts compared to the northern part of the perimeter. The interior floor is more heavily impacted in the eastern half when compared to the west, although even the later region is not free of small impacts. The floor is otherwise relatively level and lacks a central peak or significant ridges.

Satellite craters
By convention these features are identified on lunar maps by placing the letter on the side of the crater midpoint that is closest to Chernyshev.

References

 
 
 
 
 
 
 
 
 
 
 
 

Impact craters on the Moon